RLH may stand for:
 Run Like Hell (video game)
 Regent Low Height AEC Regent III London bus
 Red Lion Hotels NYSE
 Riordan, Lewis & Haden Equity Partners